"Dear Old Daddy Bill" was the  third and final charting single for Canadian band Motherlode. Not having the success of the two previous releases, it was only a minor hit for the group.

Background
"Dear Old Daddy Bill" bw " Living Life" was released  in Canada on Revolver REVS-005. It was written by Steve Kennedy, William "Smitty" Smith Smith and Kenny Marco. With the new distribution deal between Revolution Records and Compo Company, the single was released by early May, 1970.

Chart performance
In June 1970, the single reached number 10 on the Top 50 MAPL chart. It peaked at number 20 on the RPM Top 50 Canadian Content chart. It peaked at #69 on the RPM100 chart.

References

Motherlode (band) songs
Revolver Records singles
1969 songs